Hamad Al Tayyar (born 10 February 1982) is a Kuwaiti footballer.

Kazma SC

Hamad played with Kazma 2000-2007. He retired in 2007 after an automobile accident.

References

External links
 

1982 births
Living people
Kuwaiti footballers
Kuwait international footballers
Olympic footballers of Kuwait
Footballers at the 2000 Summer Olympics
Footballers at the 2002 Asian Games
Sportspeople from Kuwait City
Association football midfielders
Asian Games competitors for Kuwait
Kazma SC players
Kuwait Premier League players